Bernardo Regoliron was an Italian portrait  painter, practising in the second half of the 18th century, was a pupil of P. P. Cristofani. At Vienna there are portraits by him of the Emperor Joseph II and of his brother Leopold.

References

18th-century Italian painters
Italian male painters
Year of death unknown
Year of birth unknown
18th-century Italian male artists